Jean-François Balmer (born April 18, 1946 in Valangin) is a Swiss actor. He has worked extensively in French cinema, television and stage productions since the early 1970s.

Selected filmography

References

External links
 
 

1946 births
Living people
People from Val-de-Ruz District
Swiss male stage actors
Swiss male film actors
Swiss male television actors
20th-century Swiss male actors
21st-century Swiss male actors
French National Academy of Dramatic Arts alumni
Cours Florent alumni